A buffet car is a passenger car of a train, where food and beverages can be bought at a counter and consumed. Typically, passengers are not allowed to consume brought-along food and drinks in the car, and are therefore only able to eat in this area by buying their food in the car.

See also
 British Rail coach type codes
 Buffet
 Dining car

References

Further reading 
 Banger, Chris (March–July 2004). "On-train Catering in New South Wales - 1921-2001." Australian Railway History, pp102–118;123-141;188-198;222-237;264-279

Passenger railroad cars
Rail catering